Haichen Liang is a paralympic athlete from China competing mainly in category T46 sprint events.

Haichen competed in the 100 m, 200 m and 400 m at the 2000 Summer Paralympics winning the silver medal in the 100 m.

References

Paralympic athletes of China
Athletes (track and field) at the 2000 Summer Paralympics
Paralympic silver medalists for China
Chinese male sprinters
Living people
Medalists at the 2000 Summer Paralympics
Year of birth missing (living people)
Paralympic medalists in athletics (track and field)
Sprinters with limb difference
Paralympic sprinters